Poljana is a small settlement above the Črnivec Pass in the Municipality of Kamnik in the Upper Carniola region of Slovenia.

References

External links

Poljana on Geopedia

Populated places in the Municipality of Kamnik